Yucca baccata (datil yucca or banana yucca, also known as Spanish bayonet and broadleaf yucca) is a common species of yucca native to the deserts of the southwestern United States and northwestern Mexico, from southeastern California north to Utah, east to western Texas and south to Sonora and Chihuahua. It is also reported in the wild in Colombia.

The species gets its common name "banana yucca" from its banana-shaped fruit. The specific epithet baccata means 'with berries'. Banana yucca is closely related to the Yucca schidigera, the Mojave yucca, with which it is interspersed where their ranges overlap; hybrids between them occur.

Description 
The flower stalk is not especially tall, typically .

Subspecies

Yucca baccata has been divided into three subspecies:

Yucca baccata subsp. baccata—Datil Yucca, Banana Yucca
Yucca baccata subsp. thornberi (McKelvey) Hochstätter—Thornber's Yucca
Yucca baccata subsp. vespertina (McKelvey) Hochstätter—Mohave Datil Yucca

Distribution and habitat

The plant is known from the Great Basin, the Mojave, Sonoran, and Chihuahuan Deserts, plus the Arizona/New Mexico Mountains ecoregion and lower, southern parts of the Rocky Mountains. It occurs primarily in the US states of Utah, California, Nevada, Arizona, Colorado, New Mexico, and Texas, and the Mexican state of Chihuahua.

It is associated with Yucca schidigera, Yucca brevifolia, Yucca arizonica, Yucca faxoniana, Agave utahensis, and other Agave species. It can be found among Sclerocactus, Pediocactus, Navajoa, and Toumeya species.

The plant occurs in a large area of the North American deserts and exhibits much variation across its range. Yucca baccata specimens from the higher, mountainous regions of the Rocky Mountains is winterhardy and tolerates extreme conditions.

Ecology
It is a larval host to the ursine giant skipper, yucca giant skipper, and various yucca moths (Proxodus sp.). After feeding, the skippers pupate in the yucca's roots.

Uses
The young flower stalks can be cooked and eaten, with the tough outer rind discarded. The fruit can be eaten raw or cooked, in the latter case resembling sweet potato.

The Paiutes dried the fruits for use during the winter. It is still a popular food amongst Mexican Indians. The flowers are often eaten by rural residents.

Ancestral Puebloan peoples used the fibers derived from the leaves to create sandals and cordage, and the root was used as soap, although with less frequency than that of Yucca elata.

References

Further reading 
 Fritz Hochstätter (Hrsg.):  Yucca (Agavaceae). Band 1 Dehiscent-fruited species in the Southwest and Midwest of the USA, Canada and Baja California , Selbst Verlag, 2000. 
 Fritz Hochstätter (Hrsg.):  Yucca (Agavaceae). Band 2 Indehiscent-fruited species in the Southwest, Midwest and East of the USA, Selbst Verlag. 2002. 
 Fritz Hochstätter (Hrsg.):  Yucca (Agavaceae). Band 3 Mexico , Selbst Verlag, 2004. 
 Common names of yucca species
 Die Gattung Yucca Fritz Hochstätter
 Yucca I   Verbreitungskarte I Fritz Hochstätter
Flora of North America: Yucca baccata RangeMap
Jepson Flora Project: Yucca baccata

baccata
North American desert flora
Flora of the Southwestern United States
Flora of Northwestern Mexico
Plants described in 1859
Taxa named by John Torrey
Desert fruits
Drought-tolerant plants